Eudonia wolongensis is a moth in the family Crambidae. It was described by Wei-Chun Li, Hou-Hun Li and Matthias Nuss in 2012. It is found in Sichuan, China.

The length of the forewings is 8–9 mm. The forewings are somewhat suffused with blackish-brown scales. The antemedian, postmedian and subterminal lines are white. The hindwings are greyish white, the apex and termen are covered with sparse pale-brown scales.

Etymology
The species name refers to the type locality, the Wolong National Nature Reserve in Sichuan Province.

References

Moths described in 2012
Eudonia